The 12323 / 24 Howrah–Anand Vihar Superfast Express is a Superfast Express train belonging to Indian Railways – Eastern Railway zone that runs between  and Anand Vihar Terminal railway station in India.

It operates as train number 12323 from Howrah Junction to Anand Vihar Terminal railway station and as train number 12324 in the reverse direction, serving the states of West Bengal, Jharkhand, Bihar, Uttar Pradesh & Delhi.

The train is extended till Barmer from 1 September 2020. Since normal operation is not going on, hence the COVID Special service of this train is right now operating from Barmer.

Coaches

The 12323 / 24 Howrah–Anand Vihar Superfast Express has 1 AC 1st Class cum AC 2 tier, 2 AC 2 tier, 5 AC 3 tier, 13 Sleeper class, 4 Unreserved/General & 2 Seating cum Luggage Rake coaches. It also carries a pantry car.

As is customary with most train services in India, coach composition may be amended at the discretion of Indian Railways depending on demand.

Service

As the average speed of the train is above , as per Indian Railways rules, its fare includes a Superfast surcharge.

Routeing

Gallery

References

External links

 http://www.indianrailways.gov.in/railwayboard/uploads/directorate/finance_budget/Previous%20Budget%20Speeches/2002-03.pdf

Delhi–Kolkata trains
Express trains in India
Rail transport in Jharkhand
Rail transport in Bihar
Rail transport in Uttar Pradesh